Battlefield is a British-produced series by Lamancha Productions in Edinburgh, UK which first debuted on the American PBS channel in 1994. The series explored battles fought during the Second World War and the Vietnam War. The series employed a novel approach in which history is described by detailed accounts of major battles together with background and contextual information. The sixth and final series of the program was broadcast in 2002.

Production
The show describes the events preceding the featured battle as well as details about its aftermath. The show also goes in-depth to explain the political and military situation leading up to each battle, details about relevant weapons and tactics, analysis of the battle's cause, and its context in the war as a whole-all while using informative maps and graphical depictions of the relative strength of the respective forces and their movements during the battle in question.

The series provides a comprehensive narrative of each battle and are narrated by Tim Pigott-Smith. Visually, the show makes use of archive footage and 3D graphics. Rare colour footage specific to each battle is often included.

Episodes consist of two-hour (~100-minute) programs. Each episode of Battlefield is divided into segments. A typical sequence is as follows
Episode Title (Overview)
Prelude to Battle
The Leaders
Strategy for Offense
Strategy for Defense
The Commanders
The Opposing Forces
Weapons
The Men
The Eve of Battle
The Battle: Order of Battle and several Phases
The Battle Won
After the Battle

The series was produced by Lamancha Productions in Edinburgh, Scotland.

Episodes

Series 1 (1994)

Series 2 (1996)

Battlefield Vietnam (1999)

Series 4 (2000)

Series 5 (2001)

Series 6 (2002)

Broadcast history
The Battlefield series was originally aired on PBS Television (USA). The Military Channel showed a shortened version of the series. Major networks still showing documentaries from the 'Battlefield' series include Discovery Networks Europe (UK) and PBS (USA).

Home video release

Series 1 release
The Battlefield series has been issued in videotape by PolyGram Video (UK - PAL format) and Time-Life (USA - NTSC format). DVD collections were reissued by PolyGram Video in the UK (PAL format) in 2005. In 2010 the original series was re-released on DVD in the US.

Specifications:
Release date: 05 Feb 2005
Format: PAL, six two-hour episodes on six DVDs
Running Time: 11 hours 10 minutes
Narrator - Tim Pigott-Smith
Executive Producers - David McWhinnie, David Rozalla, Ken Maliphant
Producer - Dave Flitton (series prod.)
Directors - Dave Flitton, Andy Aitken, Justin McCarthy

Series 2 release
Specifications:
Release date: 05 Feb 2005
Format: PAL
Number of Discs: 6
Running Time: 300 mins

Series 3 release
Series Three was reissued by Time-Life as 12 segments, each 50 minutes long, on NTSC VHS videotapes. The series was produced by LaMancha Productions and produced and directed by Dave Flitton. 3D Graphics by Greg Moodie and Gavin Bonnar. A PolyGram Visual Programming/Lamancha co-production. Narrated by Gavin MacFadyen.

Series 4 release
Series Four has been published by Time-Life with 50-minute NTSC VHS videotape episodes. The program copyright is Cromwell Productions, Ltd. (2001).

Reception
For Battlefield Vietnam:

'I have never seen a sustained narrative about the Vietnam War which captures the subtle nuances of it in such clear and simple language. Superb treatment.' - Dr. Robert Goldich, National Security Specialist, US Library of Congress

'Every department of politics or modern history should invest in this set, and use it.' - Journal of Strategic Studies'

References

External links
Episode list at SideReel

Documentary films about the Vietnam War
Documentary television series about World War II
English-language television shows